Donovan Olumba (born September 26, 1995) is an American football cornerback for the Edmonton Elks of the Canadian Football League (CFL). He played college football at Portland State University.

Early years
Olumba attended Salpointe Catholic High School, where he played only one season of Varsity Football as a wide receiver and cornerback. He accepted a football scholarship from Division II Alderson-Broaddus University.

He played 3 seasons as a cornerback, competing in 30 games, while posting 63 tackles, 25 pass deflections, 2 fumble recoveries, 2 blocked kicks and 6 interceptions, including 2 returns for touchdowns (47 and 99 yards). He also had 13 punt returns for 143 yards and one touchdown.

In 2016, he transferred to Division I Portland State University after his junior season, where he was redshirted. He played only one year in 2017 and was named a starter at cornerback, after being third-string on the depth chart. He registered 21 tackles and 7 pass deflections.

Professional career

Dallas Cowboys
Olumba was signed by the Dallas Cowboys as an undrafted free agent after the 2018 NFL Draft on April 29, after the hiring of Kris Richard as the new defensive backs/passing game coordinator, when the Cowboys changed their defensive philosophy and started to look for taller and more rangy cornerbacks. He was waived on September 1 and signed to the practice squad the next day.

He signed a reserve/future contract with the Cowboys on January 15, 2019. He was released on August 31. He was signed to the practice squad on September 2. He was promoted to the active roster on December 28. He appeared in the season finale against the Washington Redskins as a backup. He was released on March 18, 2020.

Cleveland Browns
Olumba signed with the Cleveland Browns on March 21, 2020. Olumba was waived by the Browns on September 5, 2020. Olumba signed to the Browns' practice squad on January 12, 2021. His practice squad contract with the team expired after the season on January 25, 2021.

Hamilton Tiger-Cats
Olumba signed with the Hamilton Tiger-Cats of the CFL on June 10, 2021.

Los Angeles Rams
On August 6, 2021, Olumba signed with the Los Angeles Rams. He was waived on August 30, 2021.

References

External links
Portland State Vikings bio

1995 births
Living people
Players of American football from Tucson, Arizona
American football cornerbacks
Alderson Broaddus University alumni
Portland State Vikings football players
Dallas Cowboys players
Cleveland Browns players
Hamilton Tiger-Cats players
Los Angeles Rams players
Edmonton Elks players